Graal (stylized as Gr44l; ,) is the second album by Polish rapper Tau and the last released under the pseudonym Medium. It was released as a double album on November 20, 2012 by Asfalt Records. Recording took place during 2012 at Studio Łukasza Kowalskiego in Kielce with DJ Deszczu Strugi in charge of mixing the album. As with his previous album Teoria równoległych wszechświatów, production and arrangement were overseen by Medium himself.

The album was promoted with two singles: "Hologram" features a guest appearance by American rapper Gift of Gab, and "Skwer pod słońcem", which was accompanied by a promotional video clip featuring Medium's fans. Graal also features guest appearances by O.S.T.R., Bisz and Te-Tris. The album peaked at number 18 on the Polish OLiS albums chart 

On the album Medium addresses questions of patriotism, his attachment to Christian values, and his relationship with God. The rapper also criticizes the issues of globalization, homosexuality and political correctness. Although it was well-received, Graal also met with criticism, mainly for its lyrics which were considered too radical by most reviewers and listeners.

Background and promotion 
Having released his first album Teoria równoległych wszechświatów in 2011 and having received generally positive reviews, Medium announced that he had started working on a new project which would be released in late April, also stating that the news album would completely differ from the previous one. The release date was later postponed to November 2012. In interviews later in 2012, Medium began to talk about his religious conversion to Christianity and indicated that the album would be dedicated to his personal relationship with God and his long-term observations of the world.

The first single was "Hologram" which featured Gift of Gab, a member of the group Blackalicious. The second single "Skwer pod słońcem" was accompanied by a video clip featuring the rapper's fans. Medium appeared on the show Poziom 2.0 where he performed the track "Kim jesteś?". The reaction to the track was so great that his label decided to release it as the third single. Promotional videos were also made for "Nieme kino", "Graal" and "Zza grobu".

On December 12, 2012, Asfalt Records released 300 copies of the single "Hologram" pressed as a transparent 12" record. The record contained the standard version of "Hologram" and a drum and bass remix.

Artwork and imagery 

The cover of Graal was created by an artist under the pseudonym SewerX who had also been responsible for the artwork for Medium's previous album. It was revealed on October 7, 2012 on Asfalt Records' YouTube channel. The cover shows the Omega Nebula and the white triangle inscribed in its center, with a net outstretched over the image. Medium stated:

The title Graal is stylized as Gr44l. The two fours are a reference to the famous Polish poetic drama Dziady (Forefathers) by Adam Mickiewicz where the number 44 was used in scene 5 of act 3, in which Mickiewicz wrote about a "reviver of the nation" who was supposed to bring back freedom for Poland and its people. He described him with words:

In the artwork inside the CD case several crosses are also visible which represent Medium's conversion. The artwork was well received by both fans and music critics. It was placed on Barock.pl website's list of the best covers of 2012.

Reception 

The album received mixed reviews from music critics. Most of the reviewers praised its combination of modern electronic music and classic sampling, but the album was criticized for its radical and far-right lyrics. Journalist Marek Fall of Onet.pl wrote that "Graal is one of the most courageous and ambitious projects in the history of Polish hip-hop. Medium's vision combines gospel, the legacy of Polish romanticism, psycho-rap and ultra-conservative journalism. The impetus of this production arouses admiration, but Graal is often just the opposite page of Jezus Maria Peszek, where fanaticism is equal to grandiosity."

On the other hand, Marcin Flint from T-Mobile Music compared Medium to Fisz and Magik, but he also criticized the lyrical content of Graal.

Track listing

Personnel 
Credits adapted from liner notes.

Musicians
 Medium – lyrics, production, rap, arrangements
 Gift of Gab – lyrics, rap
 Bisz – lyrics, rap
 Te-Tris – lyrics, rap
 O.S.T.R. – lyrics, rap
 DJ Funktion – scratching
 DJ Kebs – scratching
 Justyna Dżbik – narration
 Lila Kowalska – vocals
 Miss Ashberry – vocals
 Izabela Kowalewska – vocals
 Paweł Piotrowsk – piano
 Rolf "Hangklang" Mönnighoff – hang, didgeridoo, shruti box, bansuri, glockenspiel
 Rafał "Rafcox" Gęborek – trumpet
 Jarosław Kulik – congos

 Technical personnel
 DJ Deszczu Strugi – mix
 Tytuz – executive producer
 SewerX – artwork
 Recording
 Recorded at Studio Łukasza Kowalskiego in Kielce
 Mixed at Otrabarwa Studio in Warsaw
 Mastered at Air Mastering in London

References 

2012 albums
Polish-language albums
Tau albums
Albums produced by Tau